Heber Hugo Carámbula, (31 October 1945 – 14 November 2015), also known under the stage name of Berugo Carámbula, was a Uruguayan actor, comedian and TV host, born in Las Piedras in 1945.

Career 
Berugo Carámbula started his career as a musician; in 1960 formed the jazz band "Crazy Clown Jazz Band". Later -already as a comedian- was part of the cast in the Uruguayan TV program Telecataplum, for which he became well known in Argentina, altogether with the other members of the cast: Ricardo Espalter, Eduardo D'Angelo, Enrique Almada, Andrés Redondo, Henny Trayles and Raimundo Soto, among others.

As an actor, Carámbula was an important member of several comedies on films, theatres and TV programs, and the TV series Son amores. He was also hired as TV host of other programs, both in Argentina and Uruguay. As a musician, he recorded in 1976 el the LP Solo de Guitarra, his only production as a classical guitar soloist.

In 1988, Carámbula was awarded with the Martín Fierro Award as the best TV host for his work in Atrévase a Soñar (Dare to Dream).

In 2004, he was diagnosed Parkinson's disease, what caused him to be out of TV and theatre for four years.

On 28 November 2008 the Departmental Board of Canelones rendered a homage to Carámbula declaring him illustrious citizen of the departamento.

Carámbula died on November 14, 2015, after a long battle with his illness.

Family 

He was married to Adriana and has three children: Joaquín, Gabriel y María. His son Gabriel Carámbula inherited his musician skills; he was lead singer and main songwriter in the rock band Los Perros Calientes, and is currently pursuing a solo career. His daughter María Carámbula is an actress; in 2006 she played Julia Demont in the TV program Chiquititas, and she currently is working in Herencia de amor.

Professional career

Filmography 
Joven viuda y estanciera (1970)
Los irrompibles (1975)
La noche del hurto (1976)
Donde duermen dos... duermen tres (1979)
Cantaniño cuenta un cuento (1979)
Señora de nadie (1982)
Brigada explosiva (1986)
Brigada explosiva contra los ninjas (1986)
Los Bañeros más locos del mundo (1987)
Los matamonstruos en la mansión del terror (1987)

Television Programs 
Telecataplum (1963)
Jaujarana (1969)
Hupumorpo (1974)
Supershow Infantil (1979)
Comicolor (1980)
El Club de Anteojito (1983)
Hiperhumor (1986)
Venga y Atrévase a soñar (1987)
Amo a Berugo (1991)
Todo al 9 (1991)
Clink! Caja (1996)
Jugar x jugar con Berugo (1999)
El Nieto de don Mateo (2000)
Hacete la América (2000)
Bien de bien (2000)
Son amores (2002–2003)

Theatre 
Con Berugo en Grupo (junto a “Tocata y Fuga”) (2008)

References

External links 
Berugo Carámbula en cinenacional (Spanish)
Berugo Carámbula (Spanish)
Un único: Berugo Carámbula recordado en Buenos Aires (Spanish)

1945 births
2015 deaths
People from Las Piedras, Uruguay
Uruguayan male television actors
Uruguayan male comedians
Uruguayan expatriate actors in Argentina
Neurological disease deaths in Argentina
Deaths from Parkinson's disease